Tonite may refer to:

 Tonite (explosive), a type of explosive
 A common variant of "tonight"; see Tonight (disambiguation)
 "Tonite" (DJ Quik song), a song by DJ Quik
 "Tonite" (LCD Soundsystem song), a song by LCD Soundsystem
 "Tonite", a song by Addictiv aka Tasha
 "Tonite", a song by Phats and Small from Now Phats What I Small Music
 "Tonite", a song by Air Supply from The One That You Love
 "Tonite", a song by Eminem from Infinite
 "Tonite", a song by The Go-Go's from Beauty and the Beat 
 Tonite, a 2000 album by Bad Boys Blue
 "Arms Tonite", a song by Mother Mother from O My Heart
 "Tonite", a song by April Wine from Harder ... Faster
 "2nite", a song by Janet Jackson from Discipline

See also

Tonie
Tonita (name)
Toñito (name)